The Rimpfischhorn (4,199 m) is a mountain in the Pennine Alps of Switzerland.

The first ascent of the mountain was by Leslie Stephen and Robert Living with guides Melchior Anderegg and Johann Zumtaugwald on 9 September 1859. Their route of ascent was from Fluh Alp via the Rimpfischwänge.

See also

List of 4000 metre peaks of the Alps

References

External links
 The Rimpfischhorn on SummitPost
 The Rimpfischhorn on Mount Wiki

Alpine four-thousanders
Mountains of the Alps
Mountains of Valais
Pennine Alps
Mountains of Switzerland
Four-thousanders of Switzerland